Disputanta is an unincorporated community located in Rockcastle County, Kentucky, United States. It is located on Kentucky Route 1787.

The name Disputanta is said to have arisen from a dispute over the name of the new post office. Many residents of the area now use the name Clear Creek.

References

Unincorporated communities in Rockcastle County, Kentucky
Unincorporated communities in Kentucky